Charles Maitland may refer to:

Charles Maitland, 3rd Earl of Lauderdale (died 1691)
Charles Maitland, 6th Earl of Lauderdale (c.1688–1744)
Charles Maitland (MP) (c. 1704–1751), Scottish politician
Charles Maitland (physician) (1668–1748), administered the first smallpox inoculation in the West
Charles Maitland (author) (1815–1866), author of a popular book on the Roman catacombs